Basselinia is a genus of flowering plant in the family Arecaceae. The entire genus is endemic to the Island of New Caledonia in the Pacific. In some (but not all) molecular phylogenetic analyses, Hedyscepe from Lord Howe Island is nested in Basselinia.

List of species 
Basselinia deplanchei (Brongn. & Gris) Vieill
Basselinia eriostachys (Brongn.) Becc. 
Basselinia favieri H.E.Moore
Basselinia glabrata Becc.
Basselinia gracilis (Brongn. & Gris) Vieill.
Basselinia humboldtiana (Brongn.) H.E.Moore
Basselinia iterata H.E.Moore
Basselinia moorei Pintaud & F.W.Stauffer
Basselinia pancheri (Brongn. & Gris) Vieill
Basselinia porphyrea H.E.Moore
Basselinia sordida H.E.Moore
Basselinia tomentosa Becc.
Basselinia velutina Becc.
Basselinia vestita H.E.Moore

References

 
Arecaceae genera
Endemic flora of New Caledonia
Taxonomy articles created by Polbot
Taxa named by Eugène Vieillard